Sea World Jakarta or also known Sea World Ancol is a marine aquarium suited in North Jakarta, Jakarta, Indonesia.  It consists of a main tank, a shark tank, and several other tanks, including a turtle exhibit. The Main tank of SeaWorld Ancol is one of the biggest aquarium in Southeast Asia. SeaWorld Ancol was briefly closed in September 2014 but reopened on July 17, 2015, to the public. SeaWorld Ancol is currently expanding to turn the aquarium into the world's largest sea park.

See also

Ancol Dreamland
Jakarta Aquarium

References

Aquaria in Indonesia
1980 establishments in Indonesia
Buildings and structures in Jakarta
Tourist attractions in Jakarta